Giannis Samaras (born 3 May 1961) is a Greek former footballer who played as a midfielder during the 1980s and 1990s.

Club career
Samaras was born in Melbourne, Australia, to Greek parents who moved there at an early age. His father, Georgios, was a co-founder of South Melbourne FC, an Australian soccer club with strong ties to the Greek community and is Australia's most successful Football side. He moved to Greece at the age of thirteen. His son, also named Georgios, recently retired from professional football.

Ioannis began his football career in 1980 with Vyzas F.C., but before long he had attracted the attention of several bigger teams and he signed for OFI Crete in the summer of 1984. He went on to play over 100 matches for Crete before he left for Panathinaikos FC in January 1989. In 1991, Samaras returned to Crete, playing 103 games and retiring in 1996. In 1988, Samaras made a guest appearance for South Melbourne Hellas (30 years after his father helped establish the club) and scored a goal as South Melbourne defeated Sydney Olympic 2-1 at Middle Park.

Samaras earned 16 caps for the Greece national team between 1986 and 1990. He scored one goal, on his eighth cap, in a 4–2 friendly win over Norway.

Samaras was appointed on 26 July 2010 as the new Technical Manager for the Panathinaikos F.C. academies, replacing Nikos Kovis.

International career

International goals
Scores and results list Greece's goal tally first.

References

External links
 
Ioannis Samaras at Aussie Footballers

1961 births
Living people
Soccer players from Melbourne
Australian people of Greek descent
Greek footballers
Greece international footballers
OFI Crete F.C. players
Panathinaikos F.C. players
Vyzas F.C. players
Super League Greece players
Greek football managers
OFI Crete F.C. managers
AEK F.C. non-playing staff
Panathinaikos F.C. non-playing staff
Association football midfielders
Naturalized citizens of Greece
Australian soccer players
Australian emigrants to Greece